Jerome Cady (August 15, 1903 – November 7, 1948) was a Hollywood screenwriter.

What promised to be a lucrative and successful career as a film writer - graduating up from Charlie Chan movies in the late 1930s to such well respected war films as Guadalcanal Diary (1943), a successful adaptation of Forever Amber (1947) and the police procedural Call Northside 777 (1948) - came to an abrupt end when he died of a sleeping pill overdose on board his yacht off Catalina Island in 1948. At the time of his death, he was doing a   treatment for a documentary on the Northwest Mounted Police. There was a Masonic funeral service for him.

He received an Oscar nomination for Best Original Screenplay for Wing and a Prayer in 1944.

A native of West Virginia, Cady started as a newspaper copy boy. He was later a reporter with the Los Angeles Record, before joining the continuity staff of KECA-KFI, Los Angeles in June 1932.  He spent time in New York in the 1930s with Fletcher & Ellis Inc. as its director of radio, returning to Los Angeles in 1936. He joined 20th Century Fox in 1940, having previously been employed at RKO between radio jobs.

References

External links

1903 births
1948 deaths
American male screenwriters
20th-century American male writers
20th-century American screenwriters